Diplacus aridus, is a species of monkeyflower with yellow blossoms. It was formerly known as Mimulus aridus.

Distribution
This species is native to San Diego County in Southern California, and to Baja California. In Baja California, Mimulus aridus occurs in association with Daucus pusillus and Adiantum jordanii.

Notes

References
 C. Michael Hogan. 2008. Coastal Woodfern (Dryopteris arguta), GlobalTwitcher, ed. N. Stromberg
 Sunset Western Garden Book. 1995. pp. 606–607

External links
Jepson eFlora:  "Diplacus aridus"
USDA Plants Profile - Diplacus aridus (San Diego bush monkeyflower)

aridus
Flora of California
Flora of Baja California
Natural history of the California chaparral and woodlands
Natural history of the Peninsular Ranges
Natural history of San Diego County, California
Taxa named by LeRoy Abrams
Flora without expected TNC conservation status